Frightmare (also known as Cover Up and Once Upon a Frightmare) is a 1974 British horror film directed and produced by Pete Walker, written by David McGillivray and starring Rupert Davies and Sheila Keith. The story focuses around Dorothy and Edmund Yates, who have recently been released from a mental asylum, and is one of Pete Walker's most notable films.

Plot

1974, the present. Dorothy Yates lives with her husband Edmund in an isolated farmhouse in Haslemere, Surrey. They have just been released from a mental institution to which they were committed in 1957 after it was found Dorothy was a cannibal who killed and partially ate at least six people. It is later revealed that her cannibalism can be understood as an attempt to cope with a childhood trauma when she found out that she had eaten parts of her pet rabbit that her parents had cooked and served as dinner. Although her husband Edmund was convicted, it is later revealed that he only faked his dementia in order to remain with his wife. He is a truly devoted husband who loves his wife dearly and does not take part in the actual acts of murder in 1957 and in the present, only helping in covering them up. Now, it seems as if Dorothy has had a severe relapse. She secretly lures lonely young people to her home, promising tea and a tarot card reading, only with the sessions ending with a violent murder and "feast".

Jackie, Edmund's daughter by previous marriage, lives in London but secretly visits her dad and stepmum at night to bring her parcels containing animal brain, thereby implicitly feigning to commit murders for her so as to contain Dorothy's murderous urges. At the same time, Jackie tries to control her 15-year-old half-sister  Debbie, Dorothy's actual daughter that she and Edmund had shortly before being committed to the asylum. Debbie has been recently thrown out of the orphanage. She now stays with Jackie and rides with her boyfriend Alec, head of a violent biker gang. Debbie incites Alec to start a fight with a barman in one of London's hip nightclubs because he denied her liquor due to her being underage. When they get thrown out, the bike gang later ambush and assault the barman with a chain but leave when spotted. Debbie, however, decides to stay behind and hides the body in the trunk of a car before the police arrive.

When Jackie berates Debbie for coming home late, they have a severe argument in which Debbie in turn asks where Jackie goes at night. When Jackie discovers Debbie's bloodied jacket and finds out from her that she was involved in the barman's murder, she and her boyfriend Graham, an investigative psychiatrist who has in the meantime himself found out about Jackie's family history, lead the police to the body in the trunk, which is missing an eye - a wound that could not have been inflicted with a chain and is reminiscent of the wounds inflicted by Dorothy on her victims. As it is thus revealed, Debbie and Dorothy have been secretly meeting without Jackie's knowledge, and Debbie has apparently taken on her mum's pathological urges herself.

Meanwhile, Debbie escapes with Alec to the Haslemere house, where Dorothy kills Alec. Jackie suggests that Graham call on her stepmum, and he goes there alone to talk to Dorothy, with Jackie following shortly after. When Graham arrives, Debbie reveals his identity to Dorothy, who kills him. When Jackie arrives, she encounters her dad alone, who tells her they feel Debbie belongs more to them than she. She starts looking for Graham and finds Dorothy and Debbie disposing of his body in the attic. As Dorothy and Debbie circle in on her, Edmund, who has followed her there, blocks the door. As Jackie cries for his help, the film closes with a freeze frame of Edmund restraining his urges to come to her aid and looking in dismay at his daughter's imminent demise.

Cast
 Rupert Davies as Edmund Yates  
 Sheila Keith as Dorothy Yates  
 Deborah Fairfax as Jackie Yates
 Paul Greenwood as Graham Heller
 Kim Butcher as Debbie Yates
 Leo Genn  as Dr. Lytell
 Gerald Flood  as	 Matthew Laurence
 Fiona Curzon as Merle  
 Jon Yule as Robin  
 Trisha Mortimer as Lillian 
 Pamela Fairbrother as Delia  
 Edward Kalinski as Alec Marini
 Victor Winding as Detective Inspector  
 Anthony Hennessey as Detective Sergeant  
 Noel Johnson as The Judge  
 Michael Sharvell-Martin as Douglas Metchick
 Tommy Wright as 	Nightclub Manager
 Andrew Sachs as	Barry Nichols
 Nicholas John as	 Peter
 Jack Dagmar  as	 Old Man

Production

Filming locations
The film was shot on location in Shepherd's Bush, London and the village of Haslemere, Surrey.

Music
The music was composed and conducted by Stanley Myers.

Release

Critical response
Time Out wrote at the time of the film's release, "it is far better written and acted than you might expect, and Walker's direction is on another level altogether from Cool It Carol! or The Flesh and Blood Show. The problem is that there is absolutely no exposition or analysis, no flexibility about the theme; still contained within a basic formula, it tends to leave a highly unpleasant aftertaste"; while Allmovie wrote "Frightmare is a potent little chiller that is worth a look to horror fans in search of suitably grim fare from the 1970's and a worthy testament to Pete Walker's distinctive genre skills"; and DVD Talk wrote, "one of Peter Walker's best known and best remembered films, Frightmare gave the director the chance to really capitalize on his working relationship with oddball actress Sheila Keith and give her a starring role that fit her unusual looks and acting style perfectly. At the same time, Frightmare also stands as an excellent example of the type of darkly humorous and semi-satirical horror movies that Walker excelled in, the kind that weren't afraid to rub the viewers nose in the dirt a little bit or to give the establishment the big middle finger salute."

Home media

Legacy

References

External links
 
 

1974 films
1974 horror films
1974 independent films
1970s slasher films
British horror films
British slasher films
British independent films
Films directed by Pete Walker
Films set in Surrey
Films scored by Stanley Myers
Films about cannibalism
British serial killer films
British exploitation films
1970s English-language films
1970s British films